Krishanadasa Narayana Bandaranayaka Brahmachari Mudiyanselage Parakrama Bandara Niriella (පරාක්‍රම නිරිඇල්ල; born 18 April), popularly as Parakrama Niriella, is a Sri Lankan director in Sri Lankan cinema, theater and television. One of the pioneer dramatists in Sri Lankan drama, Niriella is the founder of the "Janakaraliya" Drama troupe. He is also a stage playwright, a film script writer.

Personal life
In 1971, Niriella got the first job in the Sri Lankan Navy in Trincomalee in civil section.

Career
In 1974 Niriella studied at Nalanda College Drama & Theater from the Art Center Theater Academy of the Lionel Wendt Memorial Center in Colombo. He started drama career with Gamini Haththotuwegama in 1970s in Sri Lanka's first street drama troupe. He worked as the street drama organizer in Haththotuwegama's street drama troop. On December 31, 1976. he produced his first stage play Sekkuwa which was played at Lumbini Theater. The play won several awards at the State Drama Festival in 1976. Niriella won the award for the Best script. In 1998, the play was staged as a new production. In 2017, a series of celebrations were held to celebrate the achievements of Sekkuwa in the drama industry in Sri Lanka. It was held on the 13 February 2017 at the University of Colombo University of Visual and Performing Arts at 4.00 pm. In January 2017, Sekkuwa was presented at the annual polymorphic International Drama Festival held by the Institute of Theater Performing Arts in Mysore, Karnataka, India. He was the chief guest on the opening day of the International Drama Festival.

He continued to produce many stage plays such as Vinischaya in 1979 and Galileo in 1983. Then he produced Uththamavi in 1989. Afterwards, together with H. A. Perera, Niriella produced Warenthu in 1998.

Niriella directed two feature films - Siri Medura in 1989 and Ayoma in 1995. Both films were critically acclaimed and won several awards at local film festivals. In 2009, Henry Jayasena granted the rights to play Hunuwataye Kathawa through a contract. His play Charandas often played outdoors in different setups without using theater lighting effects and stage designs. The play won the highest award at the 1983 Edinburgh Drama Festival in England. In 1985, his tele-film of 90 minutes durationKadaima won special jury prize from the Golden Crest International TV Festival of Poldiv, Bulgaria and then Transtel prize for the prix Futra International TV Festival of Berlin.

In 1999, Niriella handed over an alternative theater program to the National Youth Services Council. But at that time it was not implemented due to the scarcity of the youth service council. Without any government funds, Niriella along with Udul Bandara Awusadahami took the responsibility for a plan for the mobile theater. On 29 July 2004, he created "Janakaraliya" Mobile Drama troupe Theatre of the people) with the help of HIVOS institute, Netherlands with 20 members. It is the first time that Sri Lanka drama use New Arena concept.  The first play created by "Janakaraliya" is Andara Mal. He produced the play Mati Karaththaya which won many awards at State Drama Festival. For the first time in Sri Lanka drama history, a Tamil actor won the Best Supporting Actor award and Sinhalese actor wins best supporting actor in Tamil drama for the play Mati Karaththaya.

In 2014, he won the awards for the best direction and Best Play at State Drama Festival for the play Hunuwataya, his own translation of Bertolt Brecht's "Caucasian Chalk Circle" .  In 2016, Niriella produced the Tamil version of Bertolt Brecht's Caucasian Chalk Circle" translated by Dr.Kulanthai Shanmugalingam of Jaffna, with the title "Venkatti Vattam". On 13 January 2017, he inaugurated Bahuroopi international theatre festival.

In 2019, Niriella produced two stage plays titled Wangagiriya and Gira Panthiya. The play Wangagiriya is based on the short story by the same name written by Dharmasena Pathiraja in 1960s. The play Gira Panthiya is based on the short Illustration Parrot's Tale'' written by Rabindranath Tagore.

Direction

Theater

Cinema

Tele-Drama

References

External links
 පරාක්‍රම නිරිඇල්ල, රාජ්‍ය නාට්‍ය උළෙලේ විරෝධතාවට දිරිදෙයි..!
 ”නෙළුම් පොකුණ ගැන ඔබේ ස්ථාවරය වෙනස් වෙලාද?”
 කඩේ යන එකෙත් සීමාවක් තිබිය යුතුයි – පරාක්‍රම නිරිඇල්ල
 හොරුන්, මැරයන් පත් කරගැනීමට මග පාදන ව්‍යවස්ථාවක්: පරාක්‍රම නිරිඇල්ල

1959 births
Sri Lankan film directors
Living people
Sinhalese writers
Sinhalese educators
Sri Lankan theatre directors
Sri Lankan dramatists and playwrights
20th-century dramatists and playwrights